William L. Bearley (November 20, 1902 – August 14, 1999) was an American football, baseball, and tennis coach.  He was the 11th head football coach at Fort Hays State University in Hays, Kansas and he held that position for the 1942 season.  His record at Fort Hays was 1–8.

Head coaching record

Football

References

1902 births
1999 deaths
Fort Hays State Tigers football coaches
Fort Hays State Tigers football players
Wyoming Cowboys baseball coaches
People from Rawlins County, Kansas
Players of American football from Kansas